General elections were held in Gibraltar on 30 July 1969 . The Association for the Advancement of Civil Rights remained the largest party in the House of Assembly, winning seven of the 15 seats. However, the opposition Integration with Britain Party and Isola Group held eight seats between them and were able to form a government, marking the first time since 1950 that the AACR had been out of power.

Electoral system
Until 1969 the legislature had been elected by single transferable vote. However, in 1969 the voting system was changed to allow each voter to vote for up to eight candidates.

Results

References

Gibraltar
General
General elections in Gibraltar
Election and referendum articles with incomplete results
July 1969 events in Europe